The Maltese football champions are the winners of the primary football competition in Malta, the Premier League. The league is contested on a round-robin system and the championship is awarded to the highest ranked team at the end of the season. Originally known as the First Division, it started with a disparate number of participating teams. Nowadays, it is contested by 14 teams. With a hiatus during the Second World War, the competition has been ever-present since its inception.

Sliema Wanderers and Floriana are the most successful clubs with 26 titles each, while Hibernians are the current champions.

Champions

First Division (1909–80)

Premier League (1980–present)

Total titles won 

 Clubs participating in the 2022–23 Maltese Premier League are denoted in bold type
 Clubs no longer active are denoted in italics

Notes

References 

Malta
Maltese Premier League